John W. Bunn (September 26, 1898 – August 13, 1979) was an American basketball coach and key contributor to the game of basketball. The Wellston, Ohio native played three seasons under coach Phog Allen at University of Kansas while earning his bachelor's degree (1917–21). He later became an assistant to Allen for nine seasons (1921–30). His In 1930, he became men's basketball head coach at Stanford University, where he coached college all-time great Hank Luisetti. His 1936–37 team finished the season with a 25–2 record and was retroactively named the national champion by the Helms Athletic Foundation and the Premo-Porretta Power Poll. After he left Stanford, Bunn went on to coach Springfield College (1946–56) and Colorado State College (now the University of Northern Colorado) (1956–63).

Bunn served as chairman of the Basketball Hall of Fame from 1949 to 1963. On October 1, 1964, Bunn was inducted to the Basketball Hall of Fame as a contributor. For his contribution, the Basketball Hall of Fame annually presents an award in his name.

Bunn died on August 13, 1979, in Newbury Park, California.

Head coaching record

Basketball

References

External links
 

1898 births
1979 deaths
American football halfbacks
American football quarterbacks
American men's basketball players
Baseball coaches from Ohio
Baseball players from Ohio
Basketball coaches from Ohio
Basketball players from Ohio
Forwards (basketball)
Guards (basketball)
Kansas Jayhawks baseball coaches
Kansas Jayhawks men's basketball coaches
Kansas Jayhawks men's basketball players
Naismith Memorial Basketball Hall of Fame inductees
National Collegiate Basketball Hall of Fame inductees
Northern Colorado Bears men's basketball coaches
People from Wellston, Ohio
Players of American football from Ohio
Springfield Pride baseball coaches
Springfield Pride men's basketball coaches
Stanford Cardinal men's basketball coaches